In algebra, given a commutative ring R, the graded-symmetric algebra of a graded R-module M is the quotient of the tensor algebra of M by the ideal I generated by elements of the form:

 when |x&hairsp;| is odd
for homogeneous elements x, y in M of degree |x&hairsp;|, |y&hairsp;|. By construction, a graded-symmetric algebra is graded-commutative; i.e.,  and is universal for this.

In spite of the name, the notion is a common generalization of a symmetric algebra and an exterior algebra: indeed, if V is a (non-graded) R-module, then the graded-symmetric algebra of V with trivial grading is the usual symmetric algebra of V. Similarly, the graded-symmetric algebra of the graded module with V in degree one and zero elsewhere is the exterior algebra of V.

References
 David Eisenbud, Commutative Algebra. With a view toward algebraic geometry, Graduate Texts in Mathematics, vol 150, Springer-Verlag, New York, 1995.

External links

Ring theory